Chad Robert Whitson is an American umpire in Major League Baseball who was hired to the full-time staff in 2019 and wears number 62.

See also

 List of Major League Baseball umpires

References

External links
 Career statistics and umpiring information from Retrosheet

Living people
Major League Baseball umpires
People from Dublin, Ohio
1981 births